André Thirion (14 July 1907 – 4 January 2001) was a French writer, a member of the group of surrealists, a theorist and political activist.

Biography 
After becoming a trade unionist, he turned to communism, a party he joined in 1925. His character led him to the group of surrealists he joined in 1928. A friend of Louis Aragon and Georges Sadoul, he participated in the activities of the Surrealists between 1928 and 1934. His photograph composes the framework of the work of René Magritte, Je ne vois pas la [femme] cachée dans la forêt (1928); He appears in tenth position, starting in a clockwise direction from the upper left corner. In November 1930, with André Breton, he draught the statutes of the "A.A.E.R." (Association des artistes et écrivains révolutionnaires) which the French Communist Party took over in 1932, changing the acronym to "A.E.A.R." and excluding the surrealists.

Published in 1972, under the title Révolutionnaires sans révolution, his testimony constantly "doubles as a critical commentary which revives surrealist thought while at the same time correcting its illusions". He participated to the magazine Le Surrealisme au service de la revolution, supported the film L'Âge d'or by Luis Buñuel and Salvador Dalí. He moved away from communism during the 1930s. He campaigned against Aragon during his departure from Surrealism to the French Communist Party in 1932.

During the Second World War, he incorporated the Gaullist resistance and became an MP for the Rassemblement du peuple français at the Liberation of France.

Work 
His work is divided into two groups: the first consists of autobiographical works; The other of political and erotic novels. Révolutionnaires sans revolution is the main work of the first group. It is an autobiography that relates this period and analyzes the group of surrealists.

Autobiographical texts 
1972: Révolutionnaires sans révolution, (Prix Roger Nimier)
1987: Révisions déchirantes

Novels 
1934 Le Grand Ordinaire
1975: Béatrice

Short stories 
1993: Œdipe au bordel, suivi d'autres contes inconvenants et fantasques

Theatre 
1976: Défense de : divertissement en 42 scènes
1988: L'Ange et les Homards

Other publications 
1953: L'Automne sur la mer
1975: Les éboueurs ne sont plus en grève
1973: Éloge de l'indocilité
1981: Le Vocatif
1983: Le Charme éprouvée de la bourgeoisie : à propos d'Aragon
1989: Portrait d'André Breton suivi de Bavardages et Parodies, Brussels, (with reproduction of the portrait of André Breton by Roger Van de Wouwer).

References

Bibliography

External links 
 André Thirion dans l'arbre photo on André Breton.fr
 Révolutionnaires sans révolution on Actes Sud
 Publications on CAIRN
 André Thirion on Encyclopédie Larousse

French surrealist writers
20th-century French novelists
Rally of the French People politicians
Roger Nimier Prize winners
1907 births
People from Meurthe-et-Moselle
2001 deaths